Maharshi is a 1987 Indian Telugu-language drama film directed by Vamsy who co-wrote the film with Vemuri Satyanarayana and Tanikella Bharani. The film stars Raghava, Nishanti, C. V. L. Narasimha Rao, and Krishna Bhagavaan, with music composed by Ilaiyaraaja. The film marks Raghava's debut who later prefixed the film's title to his name. The film was not commercially successful.

Plot
Maharshi is a carefree college youngster from a rich family. He is well noted in the college for his arrogant behaviour, maintaining a gang of friends, teasing lecturers and beating up classmates. However, things change when he meets Suchitra in college. She loathes him owing to his rude behaviour and does not even talk to him when he approaches her. Maharshi takes a liking for her and tries to win her by approaching her parents and showing off his wealth. Suchitra turns down the offer even after her parents show interest. Maharshi then scares and turns away the prospective grooms who come to Suchitra's home.

Suchitra meets her childhood friend Tilak, who is working as a police sub-inspector in the same town. Soon after, she expresses her wish to marry him, more with the objective of eliminating Maharshi. When Maharshi discovers this, he tries to stop the wedding, but is locked up in a police station at the insistence of his own father. However, he assumes that Tilak has used his power as sub-inspector and locked him up. He tries to attack Tilak at their own home, but stops when he sees Suchitra open the door. Gradually, Maharshi slips into depression and is hospitalised.

Maharshi's pure love for Suchitra is shown when his friend Ramana drugs Suchitra and brings her to Maharshi's home, assuming that Maharshi wants a physical union with her. Maharshi slaps his friend and explains that he wants her affection and love and not her body; they carefully take her back.

Tilak tries to help Maharshi by being friends with him and helping him mingle with Suchitra. As he recovers, they suggest that he get married, but Maharshi turns crazy at the suggestion and runs away shouting. He is hospitalised again, but manages to escape from there. He snatches Suchitra's newborn infant and escapes into the city with the police searching for him. In the end, as he falls from a building along with the baby, he dies saving it, thus earning the good will of Suchitra.

Cast
Raghava as Maharshi
Nishanti as Suchitra
Krishna Bhagavaan as Tilak
CVL Narasimha Rao as Ramana
Ramjagan

Production 
Karthik, Revathi and Rajendra Prasad were originally cast and even paid advances; however, they were later replaced with Raghava, Nishanti and Krishna Bhagavan.

Soundtrack

Reception
Griddaluri Gopalrao of Zamin Ryot, on his review dated 8 January 1988, appreciated the visuals by cinematographer Hari Anumolu. Gopalrao however criticised the soundtrack of the film, "In addition to Telugu songs, there's even one in Sanskrit but none of them are good [sic]," he added. Srinivas Kanchibhotla writing for Idlebrain.com opined that Maharshi is Vamsy's "best work till date,"  He added, "Stepping away from the comedic route that he was wildly successful at, Vamsi challenges himself on convincing the audience of Maharshi's true intentions and the severity of his love that borders on obsession and madness."

References

External links
 

1980s Telugu-language films
1988 drama films
1988 films
Films directed by Vamsy
Films scored by Ilaiyaraaja
Films set in psychiatric hospitals
Indian drama films